Kozhukkully  is a village in Thrissur district in the state of Kerala, India.

Demographics
As of the 2001 Indian census, Kozhukkully had a population of 7447 with 3570 males and 3877 females.

Major Institutions
 Swaraj U P School
 Rudhiramala Temple, Cheerakkavu[]

References

Villages in Thrissur district